POP4 may refer to:
POP4 (gene)
POP4, a proposed version of the Post Office Protocol